Benjamin Ray (born 1819 Hudson, Columbia County, New York) was an American politician from New York.

Life
He was the son of Capt. Samuel Ray. He began work as a boater on the Hudson River. In 1835, he went to New York City, learned the trade of a blacksmith, and worked for a boiler and boat building company. In 1849, he went to California.

In 1853, he returned to New York City, and was a member of the New York State Assembly (New York Co., 2nd D.) in 1856. Some time later he returned to Hudson.

He was again a member of the State Assembly (Columbia Co., 1st D.) in 1871, 1872 and 1873; and was a member of the New York State Senate (11th D.) in 1874 and 1875.

In 1888, Ray crossed party lines to endorse Republican candidates Benjamin Harrison and Levi P. Morton for President and Vice President.

References

Sources
 Life Sketches of Government Officers and Members of the Legislature of the State of New York in 1875 by W. H. McElroy and Alexander McBride (pg. 95ff) [e-book]

1819 births
Year of death missing
Democratic Party New York (state) state senators
Politicians from New York City
Democratic Party members of the New York State Assembly
People from Hudson, New York